Osman Esim Olcay (17 January 1924 – 12 September 2010) was a Turkish diplomat, ambassador, and a former Minister of Foreign Affairs.

He was born on 17 January 1924 in İstanbul. He completed Saint Joseph Highschool in İstanbul and the Faculty of Political Sciences of Ankara University.

He began his diplomatic career in the Ministry of Foreign Affairs in 1947. He was the ambassador to Helsinki in 1964 and to New Delhi in 1966. In 1969 he was the vice secretary general of NATO. 

During the 33rd government of Turkey between 26 March 1971 and 11 December 1971 he was appointed as the Minister of Foreign Affairs. After his political mission he returned to diplomacy. In 1972 he became the Permanent Representative of Turkey to the United Nations and in 1978 he represented Turkey in NATO

He died on 14 September 2010 in Ankara and laid to rest in Cebeci Asri Cemetery.

References

1924 births
2010 deaths
Diplomats from Istanbul
Saint Joseph (İstanbul) High school alumni
Ankara University Faculty of Political Sciences alumni
Ambassadors of Turkey to Finland
Ambassadors of Turkey to India
Ministers of Foreign Affairs of Turkey
Members of the 33rd government of Turkey
NATO personnel
Burials at Cebeci Asri Cemetery